Union Sportive Nœux-les-Mines is a football club located in Nœux-les-Mines, France. They play in the Régional 1, the sixth tier of French football. Their colours are yellow and blue. The club experienced its "golden era" during the late 1970s and early 80s, notably playing six seasons in the Division 2.

Managerial history 

 1947–1948: Jean Batmale
 1948–1949: 
 1955–1976: Simon Flak
 1976–1978: Guy Debeugny
 1976–1982: Gérard Houllier
 1982–1983: 
1983–1984: Jean-Claude Devenyns
1995–2005: Henri Nowak
2005–2012: Mickaël Rollin
2012–present: Romain Boulert

Notable former players 

  
 Joachim Marx
 Richard Krawczyk
 Raymond Kopa
 
 
 Augustin Gronier
 
 Patrice Bergues
 Pascal Leprovost
 Daniel Boulanger
 Patrick Gosset
 Jean-Claude Dutriaux
 Jacques Cybulski
 Joël Douillet
 Jean Ciecelski
 Jean-Jacques Owczarczak
 
 Jean-Pierre Coppin
 
 Freddy Lefebvre
 Stefan Białas
 Éric Danty
 Cas Janssens
 Erick Mombaerts
 Alexandre Stassievitch
 Simon Zimny
 Daniel Wilczynski

Honours

References 

Sport in Pas-de-Calais
Association football clubs established in 1909
1909 establishments in France
Football clubs in France
Football clubs in Hauts-de-France